Laphria virginica is a species of robber flies in the genus Laphria ("bee-like robber flies"), in the order Diptera ("flies").

References

Further reading

External links
Diptera.info

virginica
Insects described in 1917